Sima Lun (sim. ch. 司马伦, trad. ch. 司馬倫, py. Sīmǎ Lún, wg. Ssu-ma Lun) (before 250 - poisoned June 5, 301), courtesy name Ziyi (子彛), was titled the Prince of Zhao (pinyin: zhào wáng, simplified Chinese: 赵王, traditional Chinese: 趙王) and the usurper of the Jin Dynasty from February 3 to May 31, 301. He is usually not counted in the list of Jin emperors due to his brief reign, and was often mentioned by historians as an example of a wicked usurper. He was the third of the eight princes commonly associated with the War of the Eight Princes.

Early career
As Sima Yi's ninth and youngest son, Sima Lun held a number of minor titles during the Cao Wei regencies of his father and half-brothers Sima Shi and Sima Zhao. Around February or March 250, he was enfeoffed as Marquis of Anle Village, and when Sima Zhao established the Five Feudal Ranks of Zhou in 264, his fief was changed to Viscount of Dong'an, and he was designated Remonstrating and Consulting Grandee 

After his nephew Sima Yan established the Jin Dynasty as Emperor Wu on 8 February 266, Sima Lun was named the Prince of Langye Commandery the next day. He served as a general and governor at times during his nephew's reign, but was undistinguished; several times he was accused of crimes, such as when sending Cavalier Commander Liu Ji to pay laborers wanting to rob imperial furs, but each time Emperor Wu pardoned him of them. On 5 October 277, his principality was moved to Zhao.

During the early reign of Emperor Hui, Sima Lun was in charge of the military command of Qin (秦州, modern eastern Gansu) and Yong (雍州, modern central and northern Shaanxi) Provinces, but his misgovernance contributed to conditions where the Di and the Qiang rebelled under the Di chief Qi Wannian.  His chief strategist Sun Xiu was arrested and initially set to be executed, but was spared.  Sima Lun and Sun were recalled to the capital Luoyang, where he flattered Empress Hui's empress Jia Nanfeng and became trusted by her.  Lun then requested a high level office, but was rebuffed by Empress Jia's advisors Zhang Hua and Pei Wei.

As regent
Empress Jia, in jealousy, deposed the crown prince Sima Yu (born not of her, but of her husband's concubine Consort Xie Jiu). In 299, there was a conspiracy to overthrow her and restore the crown prince.  Sima Lun was persuaded to join the conspiracy, but Sun Xiu had another plan for him: he should encourage Empress Jia to assassinate the crown prince in exile, and then use the assassination as the excuse to overthrow her.  Sima Lun accepted this plan and persuaded her to assassinate the crown prince, which she did in April 300.  He then declared a coup against her and arrested her, slaughtering her clan and her associates (including Zhang and Pei).  He then forced her to commit suicide.

Sima Lun then became regent for the developmentally disabled Emperor Hui, but was described as being not particularly more intelligent than Emperor Hui.  Even though he carried the regent title, true power was in Sun Xiu's hands.  Under Sun Xiu's persuasion, he deposed Emperor Hui and declared himself emperor in February 301, offering Emperor Hui the honorific title of retired emperor but putting him under house arrest.  Emperor Hui's grandson, the crown prince Sima Zang (司馬臧), was executed.

As emperor

The act of usurpation brought widespread anger.  In order to appease those who might be angry at his usurpation, Sima Lun rewarded many people with honors.  Sun, in particular, was issuing edicts based on his own whims.  Suspecting three autonomous key princes—Sima Jiong the Prince of Qi (Emperor Hui's cousin and the son of Emperor Hui's uncle, Prince You of Qi), Sima Ying the Prince of Chengdu (Emperor Hui's brother), and Sima Yong the Prince of Hejian (the grandson of Emperor Hui's great-granduncle Sima Fu the Prince of Anping), each of whom had strong independent military commands—Sun sent his trusted subordinates to be their assistants.  Prince Jiong refused and declared a rebellion to restore Emperor Hui.  Prince Ying, Sima Ai the Prince of Changshan (Emperor Hui's brother), and Sima Xin (司馬歆) the Duke of Xinye (the son of a granduncle of Emperor Hui) all declared support for Prince Jiong.  Prince Yong initially sent his general Zhang Fang (張方) with intent to support Sima Lun, but then heard that Princes Jiong and Ying had great forces, and so declared for the rebels instead.  Sima Lun's forces were easily defeated by Princes Jiong and Ying's forces, and after declaring himself emperor for three months, Sima Lun was captured by officials in Luoyang who declared for the rebellion as well and forced him to issue an edict returning the throne to Emperor Hui.  Sima Lun was then forced to commit suicide.  Sun and other associates of Sima Lun were executed, as were all of Sima Lun's sons.

Family
 Parents:
 Sima Yi, Emperor Xuan (179–251)
 Furen, of the Bai clan
 Sons:
 Sima Fu (d. 301)
 Sima Fu, Prince Jiyang (d. 301)
 Sima Qian, Prince Ruyin (d. 301)
 Sima Xu, Marquis Bacheng (d. 301)

References

 Fang, Xuanling. Book of Jin (Jin Shu).

240s births
301 deaths
Jin dynasty (266–420) emperors
4th-century Chinese monarchs
Executed Jin dynasty (266–420) people
People executed by the Jin dynasty (266–420)
Forced suicides of Chinese people
Suicides by poison
4th-century executions
Suicides in the Jin dynasty (266–420)